Die Deutsche Wochenschau (The German Weekly Review) was the title of the unified newsreel series released in the cinemas of Nazi Germany from June 1940 until the end of World War II(March 22. 1945). The coordinated newsreel production was set up as a vital instrument for the mass distribution of Nazi propaganda at war. Today the preserved Wochenschau short films make up a significant part of the audiovisual records of the Nazi era.

History

Newsreels had been regularly released since the early days of German cinema, especially during World War I, when companies like Messter Film started producing short silent film documentaries. With the final changeover to sound films in the early 1930s, the newsreel market concentrated on four dominating production companies: Universum Film AG (Ufa-Tonwoche and Deulig-Tonwoche), 20th Century Fox (Fox Tönende Wochenschau), Bavaria Film (Emelka-Tonwoche), and Tobis (Tobis-Wochenschau). After the Nazi Machtergreifung in 1933, the production was supervised and censored by the Ministry of Public Enlightenment and Propaganda under Joseph Goebbels, who had realized the enormous significance of newsreels for his propaganda purposes.

Upon the German invasion of Poland in September 1939, marking the outbreak of the Second World War, the Nazi authorities consolidated the four separate newsreel production efforts into one, led by the Universum Film AG in Berlin. These newsreels were merged into a single wartime newsreel, but kept their respective opening titles until June 1940. After that, the merger was made public by use of a single new opening title: Die Deutsche Wochenschau. This was the sole series of German newsreels until production discontinued in March 1945, when most cinemas in Germany were closed and transport links had collapsed.

Production

Die Deutsche Wochenschau received film stock from special Wehrmacht war reporting units (Propagandakompanien) and notable cinematographers like Hans Ertl and Walter Frentz. The material was a source of footage for late Nazi propaganda films such as The Eternal Jew and The Campaign in Poland, as well as innumerable post-war documentaries. The former Tobis-Wochenschau speaker and voice-over artist Harry Giese was assigned as "the voice" of the combined German newsreel production. Despite his signature rat-a-tat narration that gives the proceedings a documentary-like tone, liberties were taken in retelling the facts in this Nazi propaganda tool.  Comedic public service announcements were delivered by the Tran and Helle duo. The Austrian composer Franz R. Friedl was musical director of Die Deutsche Wochenschau.

Newsreels typically preceded the main feature film, announced by an opening sequence derived from the Horst-Wessel-Lied; after the beginning of the Russian Campaign in 1941 it was accompanied by the fanfare motif from Liszt's Les Préludes. After the 1943 Battle of Stalingrad, Minister Goebbels ordered an increase of efforts to manipulate the war reporting in order to keep up the perseverance of the German people. However, these plans were hindered foundered on countless eyewitness reports by Wehrmacht soldiers via military mail or while on furlough, the widespread listening to Feindsender radio stations, and also the effects of Allied strategic bombing on German cities.

Die Deutsche Wochenschau was also exported to occupied territories that had been annexed to the Reich, like Austria and the Grand Duchy of Luxemburg. For other occupied regions, or for neutral nations (like Sweden), another newsreel was made: Ufa's Auslandstonwoche or 'Foreign Weekly Newsreel'.

Among the many notable scenes preserved by the newsreel are the Nazi point of view during the Battle of Normandy, the footage of Hitler and Mussolini right after the 20 July plot, and the last footage (No. 755) of Hitler awarding the Iron Cross to Hitler Youth volunteers in the garden of the Reich Chancellery shortly before the Battle of Berlin. Its last documentary, Traitors before the People's Court, depicted the trial of the accused in the 20 July plot, and was never shown.

Copyright 
Most Wochenschau films are still copyrighted; the rights are held by the federal government-owned Transit Film GmbH in Germany. In the U.S. the copyright on these films from 1914 until 1945 expired due to non-compliance with U.S. copyright formalities; the copyright was restored in 1996 by the URAA on those published after 1922. The Transit Film company then  filed so-called "notices of intent to enforce" (NIEs) with the United States Copyright Office and can now enforce its copyrights, even against parties who rightfully used their films before the URAA became effective. Nevertheless, the URAA also prevents films previously under the administration of the Alien Property Custodian from being renewed, making it difficult to enforce these copyrights in the U.S.

See also 
 Nazism and cinema
 List of German films of 1933–45
 Wehrmachtbericht, another regular means of military propaganda from Nazi Germany.
 Degeto Weltspiegel

References

Further reading 
 Bartels, Ulrike, Die Wochenschau im Dritten Reich: Entwicklung und Funktion eines Massenmediums unter besonderer Berücksichtigung völkisch-nationaler Inhalte, Frankfurt am Main – Berlin – Bern – Bruxelles – New York – Oxford – Wien, Peter Lang, 2004
 "Nazi newsreels in German-occupied Europe, 1939–1945". Special issue of the Historical Journal of Film, Radio and Television, 24, 2004, 1 
 Zimmermann, Peter and Hoffmann, Kay (Editors), Geschichte des dokumentarischen Films in Deutschland. Band 3: Drittes Reich (1933–1945), Stuttgart, Philipp Reclam, 2005

1940s documentary films
Black-and-white documentary films
Nazi propaganda films
Newsreels
German black-and-white films